Jeunesse Laïque de Bourg-en-Bresse, commonly known as JL Bourg or simply Bourg, is a basketball club based in Bourg-en-Bresse, France that plays in the Pro A.  Their home arena is Ekinox, which has a capacity of 3,548 people.

History
In 2014, JL Bourg adopted its new home arena Ekinox which replaced the Salle des Sports. This year the team also promoted to the Pro A after it won the Pro B Playoffs. They relegated back after the 2014–15 season.

In the 2019–20 season, Bourg was in the 5th place until the season was cancelled due to the COVID-19 pandemic. In the 2020–21 season, Bourg will make its European debut when it will play in the EuroCup.

Honours
Pro B
Champions: 2016–17

Leaders Cup
Runners-up: 2006, 2019, 2023

Pro B Leaders Cup
Champions: 2016

Season by season

Players

Current roster

Depth chart

Notable players

Individual awards
Pro A Most Valuable Player
Zachery Peacock – 2018

References

External links
 Official website

Bourg-en-Bresse